Remund may refer to:

Remund Lake, a lake in Minnesota
Nicole Remund, a Swiss football player